Hansruedi Wiedmer (born 8 September 1945) is a Swiss sprinter. He competed in the men's 100 metres at the 1968 Summer Olympics.

References

1945 births
Living people
Athletes (track and field) at the 1968 Summer Olympics
Swiss male sprinters
Olympic athletes of Switzerland
Place of birth missing (living people)